Kelisia curvata is a species of delphacid planthopper in the family Delphacidae. It is found in North America.

References

Further reading

 
 

Articles created by Qbugbot
Insects described in 1945
Kelisiinae